Sanatan Bisi was an Indian politician. He was a Member of Parliament, representing Odisha in the Rajya Sabha the upper house of India's Parliament as a member of the Janata Dal.

References

Rajya Sabha members from Odisha
Janata Dal politicians
Biju Janata Dal politicians
1941 births
2020 deaths